The following is a list of the Dead Sea Scrolls from the cave 11 near Qumran.

Description
Wadi Qumran Cave 11 was discovered in 1956 and yielded 21 texts of Dead Sea Scrolls, some of which were quite lengthy. The Temple Scroll, so called because more than half of it pertains to the construction of the Temple of Jerusalem, was found in Cave 11, and is by far the longest scroll. It is now 26.7 feet (8.15 m) long. Its original length may have been over 28 feet (8.75 m). The Temple Scroll was regarded by Yigael Yadin as "The Torah According to the Essenes". On the other hand, Hartmut Stegemann, a contemporary and friend of Yadin, believed the scroll was not to be regarded as such, but was a document without exceptional significance. Stegemann notes that it is not mentioned or cited in any known Essene writing.

Also in Cave 11, an eschatological fragment about the biblical figure Melchizedek (11Q13) was found. Cave 11 also produced a copy of Jubilees.

According to former chief editor of the DSS editorial team John Strugnell, there are at least four privately owned scrolls from Cave 11, that have not yet been made available for scholars. Among them is a complete Aramaic manuscript of the Book of Enoch·.

List of manuscripts
Some resources for more complete information on the scrolls are the book by Emanuel Tov, "Revised Lists of the Texts from the Judaean Desert" for a complete list of all of the Dead Sea Scroll texts, as well as the online webpages for the Shrine of the Book and the Leon Levy Collection, both of which present photographs and images of the scrolls and fragments themselves for closer study. Information is not always comprehensive, as content for many scrolls has not yet been fully published.
{| class="wikitable"
|-
! Fragment or Scroll Identifier
! Fragment or Scroll Name
! Alternative Identifier
! English Bible Association
! Language
! Date/Script
! Description
! Reference
|-
! colspan="8" style="background:#b8c7d6;"|
Qumran Cave 11
|-
|11QpaleoLeva
|Paleo-Leviticusa
|11Q1
|Leviticus 4:24–26; 10:4–7; 11:27–32; 13:3–9; 13:39–43; 14:16–21; 14:52–15:5; 16:2–4; 16:34–17:5; 18:27–19:4; 20:1–6; 21:6–11; 22:21–27; 23:22–29; 24:9–14; 25:28–36; 26:17–26; 27:11–19
|Hebrew
|Herodian/palaeo-Hebrew script
|
|
|-
|11QLevb
|Leviticusb
|11Q2
|Leviticus
|Hebrew
|Herodian/palaeo-Hebrew script
|
|
|-
|11QDeut||Deuteronomy
|11Q3||Deuteronomy 1:4–5; 2:28–30||Hebrew
|50 CE
Late Herodian
|| || 
|-
|11QEzek
|Ezekiel
|11Q4
|Ezekiel
|Hebrew
|Herodian
|
|
|-
|11QPs
|The Great Psalms Scroll
|11Q5
|Psalms
|Hebrew
|Herodian
|A unique Psalms scroll with only about a quarter of the Masoretic psalms (in atypical order), three Syriac psalms, one from Ben Sira, and the only known copies of three more unique psalms—Plea for Deliverance, Apostrophe to Zion, and Hymn to the Creator—all of which are unattested by other sources, as well as the short text of David's Compositions.
|
|-
|11QPsa
| rowspan="5" |Psalms
|11Q5
|
|Hebrew
|Herodian
|
|
|-
|11QPsb
|11Q6
|Psalm 77:18–21; 78:1; 109:3–4; 118:1; 118:15–16; 119:163–165; 133:1–3; 141:10; 144:1–2
|Hebrew
|Herodian
|
|
|-
|11QPsc
|11Q7
|Psalm 2:1–8; 9:3–7; 12:5–9; 13:1–6; 14:1–6; 17:9–15; 18:1–12; 19:4–8; 25:2–7
|Hebrew
|Herodian
|
|
|-
|11QPsd
|11Q8
| Psalm 6:2–4; 9:3–6; 18:26–29; 18:39–42; 36:13; 37:1–4; 39:13–14; 40:1; 43:1–3; 45:6–8; 59:5–8; 68:1–5; 68:14–18; 78:5–12; 81:4–9; 86:11–14; 115:16–18; 116:1
|Hebrew
|Herodian
|
|
|-
|11QPse
|11Q9
|Psalm 50:3–7
|Hebrew
|Herodian
|
|
|-
|11QtgJob
|Targum Job
|11Q10
|Job
|Aramaic
|Herodian
|A unique Aramaic translation of the Book of Job; presents Job somewhat more favourably.
|
|-
|11QapocrPs
|Apocryphal Psalms
|11Q11
|Psalm 91
|Hebrew
|Herodian
|Apocryphal paraphrase of Psalms 91
|
|-
|11QJub
|Jubilees
|11Q12
|
|Hebrew
|Herodian
|Ethiopic text of Jubilees 4:6–11; 4:13–14; 4:16–17; 4:29–31; 5:1–2; 12:15–17; 12:28–29
|
|-
|11QMelch||Melchizedek
|11Q13||Contains Pesher/commentary on Leviticus 25:13; Deuteronomy 15:2; Psalm 7:8–9; 82:2; Isaiah 52:7; Daniel 9:25; Leviticus 25:9||Hebrew
|50–25 BCE or 75–50 BCE
Late Hasmonean or Early Herodian
||Describes a tenth jubilee and portrays Melchizedek as a messianic agent of salvation, using similar language to that used for Jesus in Hebrews, such as "Heavenly Prince Melchizedek"|| 
|-
|11Q Sefer ha-Milhamah
|Sefer ha-Milhamah ("The Book of War")
|11Q14
|
|Hebrew
|Herodian
|An account of the final eschatological battle of the Israelites and the Kittim (Romans), including a messianic figure named the "Prince of the Congregation."
|
|-
|11QHymnsa|| rowspan="2" |Hymns
|11Q15||  ||Hebrew
|Herodian|| ||
|-
|11QHymnsb
|11Q16
|
|Hebrew
|Herodian
|
|
|-
|11QShirShabb
|Songs of the Sabbath Sacrifice
|11Q17
|
|Hebrew
|Herodian
|Collection of 13 hymns describing a heavenly temple service.
|
|-
|11QNJ
|New Jerusalem
|11Q18
|
|Aramaic
|Herodian
|Appears to be an apocalyptic vision, including some architectural details of a very large city (cf. Ezekiel and Revelation)
|
|-
| 11QTa
| Temple Scroll
| 11Q19
|
|Hebrew
|Herodian
| rowspan="3" |Rephrases the Pentateuch laws in the spirit of Deuteronomy, seeks to resolve biblical legal conflicts and expand ritual laws.
|
|-
|11QTb
| rowspan="2" |Temple Scroll
|11Q20
|
|Hebrew
|Herodian
|
|-
|11QTc
|11Q21
|
|Hebrew
|Herodian
|
|-
| rowspan="7" |11Q Unidentified
| rowspan="7" |Unidentified
|11Q22
|
|Hebrew
|Hasmonean
| rowspan="7" |Unidentified fragments.
|
|-
|11Q23
|
|Hebrew
|Hellenistic-Roman
|
|-
|11Q24
|
|Aramaic
|Hasmonean
|
|-
|11Q25
|
|Hebrew
|Herodian
|
|-
|11Q26
|
|Hebrew
|Herodian
|
|-
|11Q27
|
|Hebrew
|Hellenistic-Roman
|
|-
|11Q28
|
|Hebrew
|Hellenistic-Roman
|
|-
|
|
|11Q29
|
|
|
|Serekh ha-Yahad related
|
|-
| 11Q Unidentified
| Unidentified
| 11Q30
|
|Hebrew
|Herodian
|Unidentified fragments.
|
|-
| 11Q Unidentified
| Unidentified
| 11Q31
|
|
|
| Unidentified fragment
|
|-
|11Q9999
|Unidentified
|
|
|
|Hellenistic-Roman
|
|
|}

See also 
 Biblical manuscripts
 Septuagint manuscripts
 List of Hebrew Bible manuscripts

References

Bibliography

External links
 A Catalog of Biblical Passages in the Dead Sea Scrolls by David Washburn, 2002
 Textual Criticism: Recovering the Text of the Hebrew Bible by Peter Kyle McCarter, 1986

Dead Sea Scrolls
1956 archaeological discoveries
Qumran Cave 11